Saar Steele (born 28 September 1984) is an Israeli tennis player.

Steele has a career high ATP singles ranking of 1005 achieved on 28 May 2012. He also has a career high ATP doubles ranking of 580 achieved on 1 February 2010.

Steele made his ATP main draw debut at the 2011 St. Petersburg Open in the doubles draw partnering Dudi Sela.

External links

1984 births
Living people
Israeli male tennis players
Sportspeople from Tel Aviv